The 2021 season of the Taiwan Football Premier League was the fifth season of top-flight association football competition in Taiwan under its current format. The Taiwan Football Premier League includes eight teams. The season began on 11 April 2021.

Teams
A total of eight teams compete in the league. Taiwan Steel are the defending champions. Ming Chuan were relegated at the end of the 2020 season, to be replaced by inaugural Challenge League champions CPC Corporation. Red Lions were taken over in late 2020 and left the league, relaunching as a new entity called Flight Skywalkers.

 CPC Corporation (台灣中油足球隊)
 Flight Skywalkers (台北展逸天行者)
 Hang Yuen (航源)
 Land Home NTUS (璉紅臺體)
 Taipower (高市台電)
 Tatung (北市大同)
 Taichung FUTURO (台中 FUTURO)
 Taiwan Steel (台灣鋼鐵)

League table

The league was scheduled to be played over 14 rounds as a double round-robin.

Promotion/relegation playoff

At the end of the season, the seventh-placed team from the TFPL will enter a play-off with the second-placed team from the 2021 Taiwan Football Challenge League for a spot in the 2022 Taiwan Football Premier League.

Taiwan Football Challenge League

References

External links
Chinese Taipei Football Association

Taiwan Football Premier League seasons
Taiwan
1